The Mahim Causeway is a vital link road connecting Mumbai City district/South Mumbai (Churchgate to Mahim) with its Northern and Western Suburbs (Bandra to Dahisar). The causeway links the neighbourhoods of Mahim to the south with Bandra to the north.

The Mahim Causeway was built between 1841 and 1846 to connect the island of Salsette with Mahim. The swampy area between the two islands made travel dangerous and thus a need for a causeway arose. The British East India Company, who governed Bombay at that time, refused to fund the project. This led Lady Jeejeebhoy, wife of the first baronet Sir Jamsetjee Jeejeebhoy, to donate the entire amount of Rs.1,57,000/-  on the condition that the government would not charge a toll for its use or disturb the Koli community who lived around the area

The Mahim causeway forms the link between Swami Vivekanand Road and L.J.Road, being the stretch between Bandra masjid and Mahim church (St. Michael's). It is not to be confused with the Bandra-Worli Sea Link, a major infrastructural project opened on 30 June 2009 which is designed to ease traffic across the causeway by building another bridge across the Mahim Bay.

References

Causeways from Thana District Gazetteer
Mahim
Bombay/Mumbai pages

Streets in Mumbai
Transport in Maharashtra
Transport infrastructure completed in 1846
1846 establishments in British India